Connie Fife (August 27, 1961 – February 3, 2017) was a Canadian Cree poet and editor. She published three books of poetry, and edited several anthologies of First Nations women's writing. Her work appeared in numerous other anthologies and literary magazines.

Originally from Saskatchewan, she was a longtime resident of Victoria, British Columbia, and resided in Winnipeg, Manitoba, Toronto, Ontario, and Haines Junction, Yukon.

In 2000, she was one of four writers, alongside Dan David, Walter Nanawin and Anna Marie Sewell, awarded the special one-time Prince and Princess Edward Prize in Aboriginal Literature from the Canada Council for the Arts. The jury of the award described her pen as "fearless." From 1990 to 1992 she was a writer-in-residence at the En'owkin School of Writing in Penticton, British Columbia, where she was awarded a fellowship from the Canadian Native Arts Foundation to study creative 1992.

An out lesbian, she served on the jury of the Dayne Ogilvie Prize for LGBT writers in 2014.

In addition to her work as a poet, Connie Fife was an outreach worker for the Urban Native Youth Association in Vancouver, British Columbia.

Fife died in Haines Junction, Yukon on February 3, 2017, at the age of 55.

Works

Poetry
Beneath the Naked Sun (1992)
Speaking Through Jagged Rock (1999)
Poems for a New World (2001)

Anthologies
Fireweed Native Women's Issue, No. 26 (1986)
Gatherings 2 (1991)
The Colour of Resistance: A Contemporary Collection of Writing by Aboriginal Women (1998)

References

1961 births
2017 deaths
Canadian women poets
20th-century Canadian poets
21st-century Canadian poets
Canadian anthologists
Cree people
Writers from Saskatchewan
Canadian lesbian writers
First Nations poets
LGBT First Nations people
First Nations women writers
20th-century Canadian women writers
21st-century Canadian women writers
20th-century First Nations writers
21st-century First Nations writers
21st-century Canadian LGBT people